"Love Is Bubble" is Bonnie Pink's twenty-fourth single. The single was released under the Warner Music Japan label on May 10, 2006.

Track listing
Love Is Bubble

Do You Crash? (2005.9.21 Live at Shibuya-Ax)
Love Is Bubble (Instrumental)

Oricon Sales Chart

2006 singles
2006 songs
Bonnie Pink songs
Warner Music Japan singles
Japanese film songs
Songs written by Bonnie Pink